The Big Bamboo is the eighth novel by Tim Dorsey featuring the sociopathic anti-hero Serge A. Storms. It was published in the US in March 2006 and May 2006 in the UK. The plotline follows Serge A. Storms as he follows his recent obsession of Hollywood and movies, in particular the movie The Punisher, which was shot on location in Florida. Serge travels to Hollywood to write a screenplay, something that Coleman, his constantly addled companion, is constantly interrupting with obnoxious and sometimes outrageous concerns.

Another subplot involves a screenwriter who is trying to gain his intellectual property back from a major studio that is a parody of Miramax, ending with a climax that reveals that the major characters of the story have been involved in a scam of massive proportions, at the height of which several studio executives are killed during a re-creation of the parting of the Red Sea.

The name of the book is taken from the now closed Big Bamboo lounge located south of Orlando, Florida which is featured in the book.

2006 American novels
Novels by Tim Dorsey